The Community Charge, commonly known as the poll tax, was a system of taxation introduced by Margaret Thatcher's government in replacement of domestic rates in Scotland from 1989, prior to its introduction in England and Wales from 1990. It provided for a single flat-rate, per-capita tax on every adult, at a rate set by the local authority. The charge was replaced by Council Tax in 1993, two years after its abolition was announced.

Origins

The abolition of the rating system of taxes (based on the notional rental value of a house) to fund local government had been unveiled by Margaret Thatcher when she was Shadow Environment Secretary in 1974, and was included in the manifesto of the Conservative Party in the October 1974 general election. In the 1979 elections the Conservative manifesto stated that lowering income tax took priority. The Government published a green paper in 1981 under the title  Alternatives to Domestic Rates. It considered a flat-rate per-capita tax as a supplement to another tax, noting that a large flat-rate 'poll tax' would be seen as unfair.

The 1980s saw a period of general confrontation between central government and Labour-controlled local authorities, which eventually led to the abolition of the Greater London Council and the six metropolitan county councils. The commitment to abolish the rates was replaced in the 1983 general election manifesto with a commitment to introduce the ability for central government to cap rates which it saw as excessive. This was introduced by the Rates Act 1984.

Although the rates system was supposed to have regular revaluations to minimise discrepancies, the revaluations in England and Wales had been cancelled in 1978 and 1983. The Scottish revaluation of 1985/1986 led to a great deal of criticism and gave added urgency to rates reform or replacement.

The green paper of 1986, Paying for Local Government, produced by the Department of the Environment from consultations between Lord Rothschild, William Waldegrave and Kenneth Baker, proposed the poll tax. This was a fixed tax per adult resident, although there was a reduction for poor people. This charged each person for the services provided in their community. Owing to the variations in the amount of local taxes paid and the amount of grant provided by central government to individual local authorities, there were differences in the amount charged between councils.

The term "Poll tax" was coined as an alternative name because the tax had a passing resemblance to historical capitation taxes, in particular the English poll tax of 1379.

This proposal was contained in the Conservative manifesto for the 1987 General Election. The legislation introducing the poll tax was passed in 1987, 1988 and the new tax replaced the rates in Scotland from the start of the 1989/90 financial year and in England and Wales from the start of the 1990/91 financial year. Additionally, the Uniform Business Rate, levied by local government at a rate set by central government and then apportioned between local authorities in proportion to their population, was introduced.

The tax was not implemented in Northern Ireland, which continued, as it still does , to levy the rating system, despite some unionists calling for the region to have the same taxation system as Great Britain.

Implementation
The poll tax when implemented encountered a number of administrative and enforcement difficulties. Some renters did not pay, knowing they would have left Scotland when the bills arrived. Councils of towns with highly mobile populations, such as university towns, were faced with big store rooms of unprocessed "gone-aways". The initial register, which was based on the rates register for "owned" houses, contained many irregularities from supplementary data sources such as housing benefit recipients.

A significant collection issue was the 20 per cent /100 per cent split. People in employment had to pay 100 per cent, while students and the registered unemployed paid 20 per cent. The nature of the shared house market meant that not even the landlord knew exactly who was living there; tenants were replaced and may have shared a "single" room with their partner. Therefore, the local council did not know who was living where and when.

Councils were burdened with the task of pursuing the large numbers of defaulters, many of whom were acting as part of organised resistance to the charge. There is also some evidence that the poll tax had a lasting effect of people not registering themselves on the electoral register to evade collection attempts, possibly because of the false impression that the alternative name, "poll tax" created. This may have had an effect on the results of the 1992 general election, which ended in a fourth successive Conservative victory, despite most opinion polls pointing to a hung parliament or narrow Labour majority.

Opposition

The change from payment based on the worth of one's house to a fixed rate was widely criticised as being unfair, and needlessly burdensome on those less well-off. Mass protests were co-ordinated by the All Britain Anti-Poll Tax Federation, other national networks such as 3D (Don't Register, Don't Pay, Don't Collect) and by hundreds of local Anti-Poll Tax Unions (APTUs), which were not aligned to any particular political grouping. In Scotland, where the tax was implemented first, the APTUs called for mass non-payment. As the tax neared its implementation in England, protests against it began to increase. That culminated in a number of poll tax riots. The most serious of those was on 31 March 1990a week before the implementation of the taxwhen between 70,000 and 200,000 people demonstrated against the tax. The demonstration around Trafalgar Square left 113 people injured and 340 under arrest, with over 100 police officers needing treatment for injuries. There were further conflicts and protests, but none on the scale of the Trafalgar Square riot.

As the amount of the poll tax began to rise and the inefficiency of local councils in their collection of the tax became apparent, large numbers of people refused to pay. Local councils tried to respond with enforcement measures, but they were largely ineffective given the huge numbers of non-payers. According to the BBC, up to 30 per cent of former ratepayers in some areas refused to pay.

The anti-poll-tax organisations encouraged non-payers not to register, to clog up the courts by contesting local council attempts to gain liability orders, and ultimately, not to attend court hearings arising from their non-compliance. In November 1990, South Yorkshire Police said they were planning to refuse to arrest poll tax defaulters, even when instructed to by the courts, because it would be "physically impossible for the police because of the large number of defaulters".

The opposition Labour Party, at its 1988 annual conference, decided against support for a non-payment campaign. In July 1991, Terry Fields, Labour Member of Parliament (MP) for Liverpool Broadgreen, and a member of the Militant tendency, was imprisoned for sixty days for refusing to pay. At the time of Fields' jailing, Labour leader Neil Kinnock commented: "Law makers must not be law breakers."

In popular culture, the punk band The Exploited featured the song "Don't Pay The Poll Tax" in their album The Massacre, which was released on 15 April 1990.

Over 40 people collaborated on Punk Aide's 1989 compilations Axe The Tax, Can’t Pay Won’t Pay and Fuck The Poll Tax. Oi Polloi and Chumbawamba released and toured an EP called Smash the Poll Tax. A compilation album, A Pox Upon The Poll Tax, was also released in 1989. The Orchids released "Defy The Law" in response to the Poll Tax.

On their 22 March 1990 Top Of The Pops appearance, Orbital performed "Chime" while wearing hoodies with a crosshair and seemingly-abstract imagery on them. Upon closer inspection, the hoodies read (when read left-to-right) "no poll tax".

Political consequences
After the poll tax was announced, opinion polls showed the Labour opposition opening a strong lead over the Conservative government. Following the Poll Tax Riots, Conservative ministers contemplated abolition of the tax but knew that, as a flagship Thatcherite policy, its abolition would not be possible while Thatcher was still Prime Minister. Kinnock had vowed to abolish the poll tax if he won the next general election.

For this, among other reasons, Thatcher was challenged by Michael Heseltine for the Conservative leadership in November 1990. Although she prevailed by a margin of fifty votes, she narrowly missed the threshold to avoid a second vote, and on 22 November 1990 she announced her resignation after more than a decade in office. All three of the contenders to succeed her pledged to abandon the tax.

The successful candidate, John Major, appointed Heseltine to the post of Environment Secretary, responsible for replacing the poll tax. In early 1991 the Chancellor of the Exchequer, Norman Lamont, announced a rise in Value Added Tax from 15 to 17.5 per cent to pay for a £140 reduction in the tax. The abolition of the poll tax was announced on 21 March 1991.

The Conservative government was re-elected for a fourth successive term in office at the 1992 general election, shaking off the strong challenge from the Labour Party. This election defeat prompted the resignation of Labour Party leader Neil Kinnock.

Abolition
By the time of the 1992 general election, legislation had been passed replacing the poll tax with the Council Tax from the start of the 1993/1994 financial year. The VAT rate of 17.5 per cent remained despite an earlier policy of charging a higher poll tax.

Council Tax strongly resembled the rates system tax that it had replaced. The main differences were at the tax's inception: that properties were placed in bands, thereby capping the maximum amount, and it was levied on capital value, rather than the notional rental value of a property. Households with only one occupant were also entitled to a 25 per cent discount. The only substantial change since the introduction of the Council Tax form of direct taxation is the gradual introduction of certain exemptions and discounts.

See also
 Poll tax riots
 Peasants' Revolt – 14th-century rebellion against serfdom and the imposition of a poll tax
 Tommy Sheridan, Scottish socialist who originally came to prominence protesting against the poll tax
 Bedroom tax
 Window tax
 Poll tax

References

Further reading

 Alderman, R. K., and Neil Carter. "A very Tory coup: The ousting of Mrs Thatcher." Parliamentary Affairs 44.2 (1991): 125–139.
Bagguley, Paul. "Protest, poverty, peni and power : a case study of the anti-poll tax movement", Sociological review, 1995, vol. 43, n° 4, pp. 693–719.
 Anti-Poll Tax Community based campaign
 Burns, Danny. Poll Tax Rebellion (AK Press, Stirling, Scotland, 1992).
 Butler, David, Andrew Adonis, and Tony Travers. Failure in British government: the politics of the poll tax (Oxford University Press, 1994).
 Crick, Michael, and Adrian Van Klaveren. "Mrs Thatcher's greatest blunder." Contemporary British History 5.3 (1991): 397–416; the poll tax.
 Gibson, John G. "Voter reaction to tax change: the case of the poll tax 1." Applied Economics 26.9 (1994): 877–884.

1989 establishments in Scotland
1989 in British politics
1990 establishments in England
1990 establishments in Wales
1990 in British politics
Abolished taxes
Devolution in the United Kingdom
History of taxation in the United Kingdom
Local taxation in England
Local taxation in Scotland
Local taxation in Wales
Poll taxes